Global Watch is a service of the UK Department of Trade and Industry. It helps UK businesses discover and use technologies and practices from outside the UK.

External links
 Global Watch Service home page.

Foreign trade of the United Kingdom